The Tiger (also known as The Tiger: An Old Hunter's Tale, ; lit. "Big Tiger") is a 2015 South Korean period action drama film about a hunter prepared to kill the last tiger of Joseon.

Plot
In Japanese-occupied Korea in 1925, Chun Man-duk, a revered hunter, lives with his teenage son, Seok, in a hut near Mount Jirisan. Following a tragic accident years ago in which he killed his beloved wife while hunting for a large male tiger to financially provide for his family, he has retired his rifle, sworn off hunting, and become a humble herb gatherer among his cherished mountains. The Japanese governor-general overseeing the occupation gathers tiger pelts as a hobby to display cultural dominance over the Korean people, and soon becomes obsessed with killing possibly the last remaining tiger in Korea, an enormous one-eyed male that lives on the mountain; he has killed scores of hunters and evaded capture many times, including Chun Man-duk and his former hunting companions. The tiger is known locally in hushed tones as the Mountain Lord, and locals who revere it fear that the tiger's demise will allow unchecked numbers of wolves and boars, thereby upsetting the ecological balance. Gu-kyung, Chun Man-duk's former hunting partner, is the resolute but ruthless leader of a band of Korean hunters that continually attempt to track and kill the tiger for the bounty, including by killing its mate and two cubs while using the latter for bait.

It is revealed that years ago, Man-duk mortally wounded the tiger's mother when she leaped at him as he neared her kill to defend her two nearby cubs. Man-duk spares the one-eyed cub and its sibling by intervening against the more junior hunter Gu-kyung, who delivered the killing shot on their mother. He advises Gu-kyung to them to leave them to their fate, allowing the mountain to decide if they are to survive. Man-duk, however, secretly relocates the cubs to a safe den, though the one-eyed cub's sibling dies not long afterward. The surviving cub grows up to become the Mountain Lord.

In the present time, Seok loves a girl in town, and secretly joins one of Gu-kyung's hunts in aspiration of earning a bounty sufficient to convince her father to allow them to marry; during the hunt, the tiger killed all the rioters whose intentions were to lure him out of hiding. When confronted as the last man standing, Seok wounds the tiger but is himself mortally wounded. The tiger brings Seok's body to Man-duk's cabin after having fought off a pack of wolves who dragged Seok to their den to feast on his remains.

After several failures, mounting hunter deaths, and the onset of a harsh winter, soldiers of the Japanese army are dispatched to participate in escalating efforts to find and kill the tiger, and several attempts are made to enlist Man-duk to facilitate the hunt, all of which he resolutely resists.

However, following Seok's death and the wounding of the great beast, hunter and tiger, now both bereft of mates and offspring, each tread fatefully toward the snow-blasted mountain top, with the bounty hunters and army in close pursuit. Man-duk reaches the top of the mountain and waits for the tiger. Soon following, the tiger appears. The tiger charges Man-duk, but does not pounce as Man-duk fires. Man-duk sadly asks the tiger why he "stopped," and proceeds to take out a knife at the mountain's edge. The tiger eventually pounces at him, and they both fall off the mountain together to their deaths. The governor-general of the Japanese army asks the hunters what happened after the incident, and they relate to him a story about the Mountain Lord becoming a god. The governor-general comes to the conclusion that his army is unable to fight during the looming winter and has decided to withdraw until the next spring.

The film ends with flashbacks of Man-duk's and the tiger's early lives during happier times, returning to the present afterward as evening snow falls, covering their lifeless bodies, which lay side by side, locked in an eternal embrace.

Cast
Choi Min-sik - Chun Man-Duk
Jung Man-sik - Goo-Gyeong
Kim Sang-ho - Chil-Goo
Sung Yu-bin - Suk-Yi (Man-Duk's son)
Ren Osugi - Japanese High Government Official Maezono
Jung Suk-won - Japanese Military Officer Ryu
Ra Mi-ran - Chil-Goo's wife
Kim Hong-pa - herbal shop owner (Man-Duk's friend)
Park Ji-hwan - hunter Hwan
Woo Jung-kook - Member of Joseon Hunter Team
Park In-soo - Member of Joseon Hunter Team
Lee Na-ra - Mal-Nyeon (Man-Duk's wife)
Hyun Seung-min - Sun-Yi (Chil-Goo's daughter)

Reception
The film grossed  during its second weekend in South Korea. It grossed US$9,341,588 with  1,584,170 moviegoers in South Korea.

Critical response
On Rotten Tomatoes, the film has an approval rating of 100% based on seven reviews. Critic James Mudge writes that, despite not meeting box office expectations, "The Tiger: An Old Hunter’s Tale is easily one of the best Korean films of the last year, and a winning marriage of the breathtakingly grand and the quietly philosophical." Chris Sawin writes, "The Tiger is beautifully shot with an exceptional performance from the impeccable Choi Min-sik. Director Park Hoon-jung has masterfully crafted a face-off between two formidable opponents with a heartfelt history that digs deep."

Accolades

See also 
The Hunter (2011 Australian film)

References

South Korean historical action films
2015 action drama films
South Korean action adventure films
Films about tigers
Films directed by Park Hoon-jung
Films set in Korea under Japanese rule
2010s South Korean films